A pseudo-French expression in English is a word or expression in English that has the appearance of having been borrowed from French, but which in fact was created in English and does not exist in French. Several such French expressions have found a home in English.  The first continued in its adopted language in its original obsolete form centuries after it had changed its form in national French:

bon viveur – the second word is not used in French as such, while in English it often takes the place of a fashionable man, a sophisticate, a man used to elegant ways, a man-about-town, in fact a bon vivant
 epergne
 legerdemain (supposedly from, literally, "light of hand") – sleight of hand, usually in the context of deception or the art of stage magic tricks.
nom de plume  – coined in the 19th century in English, on the pattern of nom de guerre, which is an actual French expression, where "nom de plume" is not. Since the 1970s, nom de plume is accepted as a valid French expression even if some authors view it as a calque of pen name.

voir dire  – a legal phrase for a variety of procedures connected with jury trials.

See also 

 Calque
 False etymology
 False cognate
 False friend
 Folk etymology
 Glossary of French expressions in English
 Language transfer
 Lexical borrowing
 List of pseudo-German words adapted to English
 Loanword
 Phono-semantic matching
 Pseudo-anglicism
 Semantic change

References 

pseudo